The Amazing Adrenalini Brothers is a 2D Flash animated television series created by Dan Chambers, Mark Huckerby, and Nick Ostler. Starting off as online shorts in 2002, it was eventually commissioned as a full series by CITV and Cartoon Network in the UK, S4C in Wales, YTV and VRAK.TV in Canada and is a co-production between UK studio Pesky and Studio B Productions in Vancouver, British Columbia. 26 episodes were produced.

The show aired on YTV in Canada, and Cartoon Network in the United States as part of Sunday Pants. In the United Kingdom, the series aired on CITV and for a short while on Cartoon Network in 2007. Reruns were later shown on Boomerang from 2009 to 2011 and Pop from 2012 to 2015.

The show's directors Claire Underwood and Dan Chambers and producer David Hodgson picked up the British Academy Children's Award for Animation in 2006.

Overview
Three travelling showmen hailing from the mysterious land of Réndøosîa (a fictional Eastern European country that experiences an unusually high rate of natural disasters to the point that its flag is always depicted with a hole in it, as well as being at war with the neighboring nation of Grimzimistan), the three Adrenalini brothers (Xan, Enk and Adi), tour around the world staging ridiculously hazardous stunts, usually succeeding (but more out of luck than skill). In their travels, the Adrenalinis have visited many real countries and places in the world, and even many periods in history (and, in some cases, fiction).

History
The series had its origins as a British student revue act in the 1990s, written and performed by The Pox, aka Dan Chambers, Mark Huckerby and Nick Ostler. With ambitions to turn their live act into animation the trio presented their ideas to Pesky, who had just been approached by the BBC to develop a new Flash animation series for the relaunch of its CBBC website.

The original 10 two-and-a-half-minute 'shorts' were shown online, then on CBBC television in 2002 and the episode "Ocean of Terror" was awarded the Prix des Internautes at the Annecy International Animated Film Festival that summer, and went on in 2003 to win a People's Choice Award at Anima Mundi in Brazil.

By 2004 plans were hatched to create a longer-running television series based on the Adrenalini Brothers. And in 2005 the series of 78 seven-minute episodes went into production as a UK-Canadian co-production, with pre- and post-production by Pesky in their London studio, animation by Studio B in Vancouver, and scripting shared between writers on both sides of the Atlantic. The series first aired as part of Sunday Pants on Cartoon Network in the United States on 2 October 2005, and then it first aired as a full series in March 2006 on CITV in the UK, then YTV on 7 May 2006 (and later also VRAK.TV in Canada) followed by Cartoon Network across Europe and Asia. The series has enjoyed particular success in Australia where it was first aired by ABC Australia on 2 March 2006 in a regular early evening slot until 2010.

In 2006 the series began the year by picking up a Pulcinella Award at the Cartoons On The Bay festival in Italy and ended the year with the episode "Hunchback of Heartbreak" winning a BAFTA for Best Animation Series.

Broadcast

DVD releases
The series first came out in Australia, in two separate volumes.
In the UK, Studiocanal released a 3-disc set on 9 April 2012, containing all 78 episodes from the TV series (1 & 2); in this release, two episodes, "Tails of Longing!" and "Dragon of Antagonism!" were edited to remove scenes that would have been considered imitable behaviour easily copied by children (specifically, Xan and Adi attempting to use a washing machine as a submersible in the former, and a glasses-less Xan catching a still-live firework before throwing it down in a panic after recognising it in the latter), these scenes are retained on the HuHa YouTube channel. The original online episodes are not included. There are currently no DVDs for Region 1.

YouTube
The original web episodes were uploaded on the official Adrenalini channel on YouTube, while an episode from the TV series would be uploaded on Mondays. From its launch in November 2012, the television series moved to an adult animation YouTube channel called "Huha", with an episode being uploaded every Friday until Huha ceased uploading in early 2014. A French and German version of the channel also includes episodes from the series.

References

External links
 Official Amazing Adrenalini Brothers website
 The Amazing Adrenalini Brothers on HuHa (via YouTube)
 The Amazing Adrenalini Brothers on HuHa (In French)
 The Amazing Adrenalini Brothers on HuHa (In German)

2006 British television series debuts
2007 British television series endings
2006 Canadian television series debuts
2007 Canadian television series endings
2000s Canadian animated television series
British children's animated comedy television series
British flash animated television series
Canadian children's animated comedy television series
Canadian flash animated television series
BAFTA winners (television series)
English-language television shows
ITV children's television shows
YTV (Canadian TV channel) original programming
Fictional stunt performers
Television series by DHX Media